Symplocos fuscata is a species of plant in the family Symplocaceae. It is endemic to Ecuador.  Its natural habitat is subtropical or tropical moist montane forest.

References

External links
 

Endemic flora of Ecuador
fuscata
Vulnerable plants
Taxonomy articles created by Polbot